Weh Island (Indonesian: Pulau Weh), often known as Sabang after the city of which the island is administrated, is a small active volcanic island to the northwest of Sumatra, 45 minutes by fast regular ship or 2 hours by ferry from mainland, Banda Aceh. It was originally connected to the Sumatran mainland and became separated by sea after the volcano's last eruption in the Pleistocene era. The island is situated in the Andaman Sea.

The island is known for its ecosystem; the Indonesian government has declared  of inland and sea around the island as a wildlife protection area. A rare megamouth shark species was found on shore and the island is the only habitat for the threatened toad, Duttaphrynus valhallae (formerly Bufo valhallae). Coral reef areas around the island are known for their large variety of fish species.

Geography 
Weh Island is located in the Andaman Sea, where two groups of islands, the Nicobar Islands and Andaman Islands, are scattered in one line from Sumatra to the north up to the Burma plate. The Andaman Sea lies on an active moving small tectonic plate (microplate). A complex geological fault system and volcanic arc islands have been created along the length of the sea by the movement of the microplate.

The island is small at only , but mountainous. The last known eruption is estimated to have occurred in the Pleistocene age, as a result which the mountain partially collapsed and was filled by the sea, forming a separate island.

At Gapang Beach (Gapang is name of a kind of a tree), one hour from Balohan Port to the west, there are also underwater fumaroles which are suitable for diving and are called Hydrothermal Point. A volcanic cone is found in the jungle.

There are four islets surrounding Weh Island: Klah, Rubiah, Seulako, and Rondo. Among those, Rubiah is well known for diving tourism, because of its coral reefs. When traveling to Saudi Arabia was only possible by sea, Rubiah was used as a place of quarantine for Indonesian Muslims during the Hajj pilgrimage season.

Inhabitants 
Weh Island is a part of Aceh province. A 1993 census reported 24,700 inhabitants. The large majority of the population are Acehnese and the remaining are Minangkabau, Javanese, Batak and Chinese. It is unknown when the island was first inhabited. Islam is the main religion, as Aceh is a special province where Sharia law has been applied exclusively for the province. However, there are some Christians and Buddhists on the island. They are mostly Javanese, Batak and Chinese.

On 26 December 2004, a 9.1–9.3  undersea earthquake struck in the Andaman Sea. The earthquake triggered a series of tsunamis that killed at least 130,000 people in Indonesia alone. The effect on the island was relatively small, but it is unknown how many of its inhabitants were killed by the event.

Economy 

The economy on Weh Island was dominated by agriculture. The main products were cloves and coconuts. Small-scale fisheries operate in the area, and fishermen have used explosives and cyanide fishing extensively. As of 2021, Sabang city's economy and consequently the island itself has since diversified with much of it being dominated by construction, trading, and service sectors.

Each year, 50,000 vessels pass through Malacca Strait. In 2000, the Indonesian government declared Sabang a Free Trade Zone and Free Port, to gain economic benefit by establishing the port as a logistic hub for international vessels passing through the strait. Infrastructures for a deep water harbour, port, warehousing and refuelling facilities, were developed. Weh Island is served by the Maimun Saleh Airport located in Sabang. Currently there is no airlines serving that airport. Thus, the nearest airport to get into Sabang is the Sultan Iskandarmuda Airport which is located at Banda Aceh. From the airport of Banda Aceh, it's about a half-hour drive to Ulee Lheu, close to the center of Banda Aceh, from where the ferries to Balohan (Pulau Weh's ferry harbour) are leaving.

Weh Island is also known for ecotourism. Underwater diving, hiking through the volcanic mountain and beach resorts are the main attractions. A small village, Iboih, is known as a location for scuba diving. A few meters from Iboih is the Rubiah islet that is known for its coral reefs. There are also several dive operators in Gapang.

Ecosystem 
During 1997–1999, Conservation International conducted a survey of the coral reef in the area. According to the survey, the coral diversity is relatively low, but fish species variation is rich. Some species found during the survey include Pogonoperca ocellata, Chaetodon gardneri, Chaetodon xanthocephalus, Centropyge flavipectoralis, Genicanthus caudovittatus, Halichoeres cosmetus, Stethojulis albovittatus, Scarus enneacanthus, Scarus scaber and Zebrasoma desjardinii.

On 13 March 2004, a specimen of a rare and unusual species of shark, megamouth shark, was washed ashore on Gapang beach. The megamouth shark has a distinctive large mouth, very short snout and is broadly rounded in dorsal view. The specimen is said to be the 21st (some say it is the 23rd) sighting of the species since its discovery in 1976. , there have only been 36 findings of megamouth sharks in the Pacific, Indian and Atlantic oceans.

The 2004 Indian Ocean earthquake and tsunami affected the island's ecosystem. At Iboih village, a large swath of mangrove was destroyed. Debris from the land was deposited on the nearby reefs as a result of the tsunami. In 2005, about 14,400 mangrove seedlings were replanted to save the mangrove forest.

Apart from underwater ecosystem, Weh island is the only habitat of one threatened species of toad, Duttaphrynus valhallae (formerly Bufo valhallae). The species is only known from the holotype from the island. Due to heavy deforestation on the island, the survival of the species is uncertain.

Sabang International Regatta
Sabang International Regatta was held on September 13 to 25, 2011. The participants were expected from Australia, United States, England, Germany, Malaysia, Singapore, Thailand and Hong Kong.

Tourism
Weh Island is a small island and some beaches can be visited in one day only by rental vehicles, because there is no public transport.
 Anoi Itam Beach, with its black sandy beach, is a half-hour drive from Balohan Port. For a small fee, a visitor can enter Anoi Itam Resort.
There are several diving resorts. 
 Iboih Beach,  from Gapang Beach is the busiest beach in Weh Island.

See also 

 List of volcanoes in Indonesia

References

External links 
 Official site

Stratovolcanoes of Indonesia
Subduction volcanoes
Volcanoes of Sumatra
Mountains of Sumatra
Underwater diving sites in Indonesia
Islands of Aceh
Pleistocene stratovolcanoes
Islands of the Indian Ocean
Populated places in Indonesia